Jessica Dougherty (born 1975), is a modern pin-up artist, notable for being featured artist in a number of art and tattoo books and magazines.

There are several online pin-up galleries and blogs/publications showing and talking about Jessica's work and she has been featured in a number of group and solo shows in the Seattle area.  She has also been involved in web and corporate work, including work for Eidos Interactive.

References

Living people
American artists
1975 births